The filmography of Joan Rivers includes over 25 feature films, numerous television and documentary series, seven filmed comedy specials, game shows, and other media. She began her career as a stand-up comedian, and had a years-long tenure as a host and regular guest on The Tonight Show with Johnny Carson from 1965 to 1986.

Rivers's first major film was Rabbit Test (1978), which she had a small part in and also co-wrote and directed. She would later supply the voice of Dot Matrix, the robot in Mel Brooks's Spaceballs (1986), and have a cameo as herself in John Waters's cult comedy-horror film Serial Mom (1994). In 1995, she provided a voice role in the Australian children's film Napoleon, and later appeared as herself in Shrek 2 (2004) and First Daughter (2004). From 2010 until her death in 2014, Rivers hosted the series Fashion Police, a panel series profiling and critiquing the red carpet attire of celebrities.

Films

Documentaries

Television

Series

Stand-up comedy series

Documentary series

Television movies

Stand-up comedy specials

Documentaries

Talk shows

Variety shows

Variety/Tribute specials

Award shows

Reality television shows

Game shows

Home videos

Documentary

Stand-up comedy specials

Sketch/tribute specials

Theater

References

Actress filmographies
American filmographies